Trachylepis aureogularis, the Guinea mabuya or orange-throated skink, is a species of skink found in Guinea, Liberia, Ivory Coast, and Ghana.

References

Trachylepis
Reptiles described in 1885
Taxa named by Fritz Müller (doctor)